ICGC may refer to:
 Imperial College Gliding Club
 International Cancer Genome Consortium
International Central Gospel Church